Lanfair Buttes, also known as Eagle Mountain, Indian Hill, Eagle Hill, Graveyard Hills is a summit in the Mojave National Preserve in the Mojave Desert in San Bernardino County, California. The Lanfair Buttes lie 3 miles (4.8 km) east-southeast of the Grotto Hills and 8 miles (13 km) north-northeast of Hackberry Mountain in Lanfair Valley. The tallest and northernmost elevation in the Lanfair Buttes is Eagle Mountain at 1338 feet. Indian Well petroglyphs indicate it was a Native American water source and camping site in previous centuries. Indian Well was also located along the route of the Mohave Trail.

The Lanfair Buttes are a landmark, found about a mile north of the Mojave Road at mile 40.

References

Mountains of San Bernardino County, California
Mojave National Preserve
Lanfair Valley